Choi Kyong-sob (born 29 May 1972) is a North Korean table tennis player. He competed at the 1992 Summer Olympics and the 1996 Summer Olympics.

References

1972 births
Living people
North Korean male table tennis players
Olympic table tennis players of North Korea
Table tennis players at the 1992 Summer Olympics
Table tennis players at the 1996 Summer Olympics
Place of birth missing (living people)
Asian Games medalists in table tennis
Table tennis players at the 1990 Asian Games
Asian Games silver medalists for North Korea
Medalists at the 1990 Asian Games
20th-century North Korean people